Seta Dadoyan is an Armenian scholar who specializes in medieval Armenian political and intellectual history in their interactive aspects with the Near Eastern world. She was a professor of Cultural Studies, Philosophy and Art at the American University of Beirut (AUB) between 1986 and 2005. She has also taught at other universities including the Haigazian University (1981-1986), Columbia University (2002, 2006), St. Nerses Seminary (2007-2010), the University of Chicago (2010) She has written over fifty articles and ten books, and is believed to be the first Armenian woman to have received a Doctor of Sciences in Philosophy focusing on the history of Armenian philosophy. Her scholarly work focuses on medieval Armenian history with a special emphases on the relationship between the Armenians and Muslims; she is considered a leading scholar in this field.

Life
Seta Dadoyan was born in Aleppo, Syria, to an Armenian family. She moved to Beirut, Lebanon, where she received her Master of Arts degree in Philosophy from the American University of Beirut in 1969.  In 1986 Dadoyan became a professor at the American University of Beirut, and remained there until 2005. Dadoyan has also studied art in Beirut and London and is a painter.

Her lectures have received acclaim by academics and scholars including Michael Morony, who said they will raise "the consciousness of people about the involvement of Armenians in the general history of the Middle East." James R. Russell called them "an intellectual feast". In 1999, Dadoyan was awarded the David Anhaght medal, the highest medal granted by the Armenian Academy of Philosophy, for her contributions to Armenian philosophical studies. In 2015, she has awarded the "St. Mesrop Mashtots" badge of honor by Aram I, the Catholicos of the Great House of Cilicia of the Armenian Apostolic Church  in Antelias, Lebanon.

Works

Books
Islam in Armenian Literary Culture: Texts, Contexts, Dynamics. Leuven: Peeters, 2021. , 
The Armenian Condition in Hindsight and Foresight- A Discourse /  2015 – Հայ Վիճակը Յետահայեցութեամբ և Նախահայեցութեամբ – Վերլուծում մը. Ottawa, Canada: Indepredent Publisher, 2015. 
The Catholicosate of Cilicia - History, Mission, Treasures. Editor, Co-Author. Antelias, Lebanon: Catholicosate Publications, 2015. 
The Armenians in the Medieval Islamic World – Paradigms of Interaction Seventh to Fourteenth Centuries . Volume Three: Medieval Cosmopolitanism and Images of Islam-Thirteenth to Fourteenth Centuries. New Brunswick: U.S.A. & London, UK: Transaction Publishers, 2013. 
The Armenians in the Medieval Islamic World – Paradigms of Interaction Seventh to Fourteenth Centuries. Volume Two: 	
Armenian Realpolitik in the Islamic World and Diverging Paradigms - The  Case of Cilicia - Eleventh to Fourteenth Centuries.  New Brunswick, U.S.A. & London, UK: Transaction Publishers, 2012. 
The Armenians in the Medieval Islamic World – Paradigms of Interaction - Seventh to Fourteenth Centuries. Volume One: The Arab Period in Armīnyah - Seventh to Eleventh Centuries. New Brunswick (U.S.A.) & London (UK): Transaction Publishers, 2011. 
The Armenian Catholicosate from Cilicia to Antelias − An Introduction. Antelias, Lebanon: Catholicosate Publications, 2003.
The Contribution of the Armenian Church to the Christian Witness in the Middle East. Editor, Co-Author. Antelias, Lebanon: Catholicosate Publications, 2001. 
The Fatimid Armenians - Cultural and Political Interaction in the Near East. Islamic History and Civilization Series. Leiden: E.J. Brill, 1997. 
Յովհաննէս Երզնակացիի 'Ի Տաճկաց Իմաստասիրաց'ը և Իմաստատիրական Արձակը Իսլամական Աղբիւրներուն Լոյսին Տակ [John of Erznka: 'Views from the Writings of Islamic Philosophers' and  Philosophical Treatises in the Light of their Islamic Sources – Ikhwān al Ṣafā’]. Beirut: Catholicosate Publications, 1991.
Էջեր Արևմտահայ Մտածումէն – Ե. Տէմիրճիպաշեան, Տ. Չրաքեան-Ինտրա, Շ. Պէրպէրեան, Գ. Գավաֆեան, Դանիէլ Վարուժան [Pages of West Armenian Philosophical Thought – E. Temijibashian, T. Chrakian-Indra, Sh. Perperian, G. Gavafian, Daniel Varujan].  Beirut: A.G.B.U., 1987. (Winner of H. Uzunian Award for Best Armenian Book of 1987).
Լիբանանահայ Նկարչութիւնը Ինքնութեան Տագնապին Լոյսին Տակ [Armenian Painting in Lebanon in the Light of the Crisis of Identity]. Antelias, Lebanon: Catholicosate Publications, 1984.

Articles
"The Move of the Armenian Catholicosate from Armenia to Antelias”, The Armenian Catholicosate of Cilicia: History, Treasures, Mission. Edited by Seta B. Dadoyan. Beirut: Catholicosate Publications, 2015, 22-67.
“Matt‘ēos Jułayec‘i”, Christian-Muslim Relations - A Bibliographical Historical Bibliography.  Leiden: Brill, 2013, 309-313.
“Yovhannēs Erznkac‘i Bluz”, Christian-Muslim Relations  - A Bibliographical Historical Bibliography. Leiden: Brill, 2012, vol. IV (1200-1350), 572-578.
“The Fatimid Armenians”, Christian-Muslim Relations - A Bibliographical Historical Bibliography. Leiden: Brill, 2011, vol.  II (900-1050), 25-27.
“Badr al-Jamālī”, In. Encyclopedia of Islam Three. Leiden: Brill, 2010. 133-134.
“Bahrām al-Armani”, In. Encyclopedia of Islam Three. Leiden: Brill, 2011. 63-64.
“Cilicia: The Philosophical Legacy between East and West”, Hask Armenological Yearbook,  vol. XI, (2009), 349-384.
“A Phenomenology of Armenian Studies: The Discipline and the ‘National’ Meta-Polis",  Le Muséon, vol. 121-Fasc. 1-2 (2008), 213-229.
“The Year of Armenian Studies: NAASR Oct. 2002, Erevan, Sep. 2003, AIEA Venice/Lecce Oct. 2003,  Journal of Armenian Studies, Vol. VIII, 2, Fall(2006), 3-15.
“The Chronicle of Michael the Syrian and the Armenian Version of 1248: A Textual Comparison”,  Hask Armenological Yearbook, X(2003-2006), 257-275.
“The Nāṣirī Futuwwa Literature and the Brotherhood Poetry of Yohannēs and Konstandin Erzenkac‘i – Texts and Contexts”, in J. J.Van Ginkel, H.L. Murre-van den Berg, T. M. van Lint (eds) Redefining Christian Identity: Cultural Interaction in the Middle East since the Rise of Islam. (Leuven: Peeters, 2005), 237-264.
“The Constitution of the Brotherhood of Erzinjān (1280): An Armenization of the Futuwwa  Reform Project and Literature of ‘Abbāsid Caliph al-Nāṣir lī-dīn Allāh”, Revue des Études Arméniennes, NS, vol. 29 (2003-2004), 117-165.
“Armenian Persistence: National Identity between Myth and Reality”, Journal of Armenian Studies, vol. VII, 1 (Fall-Winter 2002-2003), 77-98.
“The Armenian Catholicosate from Cilicia to Antelias”. The Contribution of the Armenian Church to the Christian Witness in the Middle East (Editor, Co-Author) S. B. Dadoyan.  Antelias Beirut: Catholicosate Publications, 2001, 21-80.
“The Spirituality of the Armenian Church in Armenian Miniatures: Unity of Spirit and Vision”,  The Contribution of the Armenian Church to the Christian Witness in the Middle East. Edited and co-authored by S. B. Dadoyan, Antelias Beirut: Catholicosate Publications, 2001.147-155.
“Islam and Armenian Polemical Strategies at the End of an Era: Matt‘ēos Ĵułayec'i  and Grigor Tat‘evac‘i”, Le Muséon, October(2001),  305-326.
“Feminism in Armenian History: Origins in Medieval Heresies”, Armenian Mind - Journal of the Philosophical Academy, National Academy of Sciences of Armenia, V, 1-2 (2001), 18-31.
“The Problematic of Dissidence and Heresy in the Making of the National: The Armenian Case in the Medieval Middle East”, Hask Armenological Yearbook of the Catholicosate of Cilicia, 9(1997- 2000), 101-113.
“The Armenian Meta-System and the Near Eastern Diaspora” (Paper presented at the Workshop on Cultural Resistance and Globalization). Orientwissenschaftliche Hefte,  2 (2001) of Orientwissenschaftliches Zentrum, 1-18.
“The Armenian Intermezzo in Bilād al-Shām: 10th to 12th Centuries”. In Syrian Christians under Islam: The First Thousand Years. Leiden: E. J.Brill, 2001. 159-183
“Armenians in contact with Islam - Seventh to Fourteenth Centuries”. In Het Christelijk Oosten (The Christian East), Periodical of the Institute of Eastern Christian Studies at Nijmegen, the Netherlands, Special Issue on Armenia, December 52 (2000), 175-199.
“Yānis”, Encyclopedia of Islam – 2nd Ed. Leiden: E. J. Brill. 
“Technology and Women in the ESCWA Region: Strategies between Local Actuality and Global Virtuality”, Proceedings of the ESCWA Expert Group Meeting of the Technology Section of the United Nations- November 1–3, 2000, Beirut: 2001.
“Die Armenier und die islamische welt Paradigmen sozio-politischer Interaktion”, Armenisch-Deutsche Korrepondenz, 2(2000 - No.108), 33-35
“Grigor of Tat‘ew: Treatise against the Tajiks”, Islam and Christian-Muslim Relations, 7, 2(1996).
“The Phenomenon of the Fatimid Armenians”, Medieval Encounters, 2.3(1996), E. J. Brill, 193-213.
“Data for the History of Medieval Arab-Armenian Relations”, Haigazian Armenological Review, XII(1992), 339-355.
“Footnotes to an Unwritten History of Arab-Armenian Relations”. In: Studies in History and Literature. Festschrift in honor of N. A. Ziadeh, London: 1992. 108-119.
“A Thirteenth Century Armenian summary of the Epistles of the Brethren of Purity (Rasā’il Ikhwān al-Ṣafā’)”,  Al-Abḥāth Journal of the American University of Beirut,  XXXX(1992). 3-18.
“The Epistles of the Brethren of Purity: As the Sources of John of Erzenka’s ‘Views’ “, Journal of Erevan State University, I(1991), 63-78.
“The Problem of the sources of John of Erzenka’s Views”, Journal of the Dept. of Humanities of the Academy of Sciences of Armenia, II(1991), 22- 43.
“A Unique phenomenon in Arab-Armenian Cultural Relations during the 13th Century”, Journal of Erevan State University, II(1990), 11-26.
“A Comparative Study of the Texts of John of Erzenk’s Views and Rasā'il Ikhwān al-Ṣafā’”, Shirak Literary Journal, 10-12(1990). 135-160.
“A Concise philosophical Glossary in the West Armenian Dialect”, Hask Armenological Yearbook of the Catholicosate of Cilicia, IV-V(1983-1984), 219-234.
“Indra – Tiran Č‘rakean: The ‘Pallid Atlas’ of West Armenian thought", Hask Armenological Yearbook of the Catholicosate of Cilicia, IV-V(1983-1984),179-218.
“Šahan Berberean: Philosophy of art”, Hask Armenological Yearbook of the Catholicosate of Cilicia, II-III (1982), 85-110.
“David Invictus: Refutation of Pyrrhonian Skepticism”, Hask Armenological Yearbook of the Catholicosate of Cilicia, I(1980), 73-90.
“T‘oros Ṙoslin and Sargis Picak”, Haigazian Armenological Review of Haigazian University, VIII(1981), 235-252.
“A Survey of the History of Armenian Painting in Lebanon”, Haigazian Armenological Review of Haigazian University, VII(1981),315-352.
“Rasā’il Ikhwān al- Ṣafā’: The Source of John of Erznka's 'Views from the Writings of Islamic Philosophers’", Haigazian Armenological Review, VI(1977–78), 51-70.

References

External links
Seta Dadoyan lecture on 4/22/12 on "The Armenians and Islam" (YouTube video)
Seta Dadoyan lecture on 5/26/12 on "Armenian Identity, Knowledge and Studies: Synthesis and/or Controversy" (YouTube video)

Ethnic Armenian historians
People from Aleppo
Academic staff of the American University of Beirut
Academic staff of Haigazian University
Living people
Armenian studies scholars
Middle Eastern studies
Year of birth missing (living people)